The drag panic (also called drag queen panic) is an ongoing moral panic in the United States stemming from the belief that drag, when exposed to minors, can be harmful, due to its perception as sexual in nature. The drag panic originated in early 2019 in the US, then accentuated after January 6 United States Capitol attack of 2021. The panic has become more prominent in 2022, arising in the United Kingdom and Canada in a series of rallies and counter-rallies related to drag queens performing in front of minors.

In 2022, there were 141 attacks recorded related to drag culture and general homophobia in the United States.

Background 

Although drag queen performances have been present for many centuries, only in the second half of the 20th century did drag queens appear in works of wide popular relevance (Some Like It Hot, The Birdcage, The Adventures of Priscilla, Queen of the Desert). Drag queen art continued to gain popularity even in the early 21st century with shows like RuPaul's Drag Race, We're Here, and Dragnificent!.

Due to the attention paid to the phenomenon on the rise in 2019; later in the years figures belonging to the alt-right as Libs of TikTok, Matt Walsh, Tucker Carlson, Michael Knowles, Dennis Prager, Candace Owens, and Ben Shapiro began to link drag queens to the LGBT grooming conspiracy theory, calling to limit their visibility.

Timeline 
In 2023 Tennessee governor Bill Lee signed a bill to equate drag queen performances with sexual performers. Subsequently, a 1977 photo emerged of Lee dressed in drag in the company of minors.

See also 

 Anti-gender movement
 Anti-LGBT rhetoric
 LGBT grooming conspiracy theory
 Bathroom bill
 2022 drag performance protests

Notes

References 

Anti-drag sentiment
Conspiracy theories in the United States
Disinformation operations
Drag (clothing)
Drag queens
Female impersonators
Gay effeminacy
LGBT and society
LGBT-related controversies in the United States
LGBT-related legislation
Moral panic
Performance art
Right-wing politics in the United States
Social phenomena
Transphobia
Violence against LGBT people